is a 2008 Japanese film. The film was directed by Katsuhide Motoki, and stars Rena Tanaka, Mayuko Fukuda and Etsushi Toyokawa. Rena Tanaka and Mayuko Fukuda play the adult and the young version of Akari Saito respectively, while actor Etsushi Toyokawa stars as Akari's father.

Based on a novel by Hare Kawaguchi, this film tells the story of Akari Saito and her dog named Socks. The pair supported each other as they grew up together. This story is closely tied to "The Ten Commandments of Dog Ownership", a list of ownership rules written from a dog's point of view.

10 Promises to My Dog was released in the Japanese box office on 15 March 2008. The film grossed a total of US$15,332,225 in 6 countries, and was the 19th-highest grossing Japanese film of 2008.

Plot
Akari is neglected by her father, a top surgeon who works long hours and puts his career before family. Her mother is hospitalized because of an incurable disease. Therefore, Akari longs for a dog who can keep her company. One day, a Golden Retriever puppy unexpectedly appears in the garden of Akari's house, and Akari immediately decides to adopt it. At her mother's suggestion, Akari christens it "Socks", because the puppy's white paws made it look like it was wearing white socks. Her mother also makes Akari promise that she will follow The Ten Commandments of Dog Ownership when she takes care of Socks. Akari also has a friend, Susumu, who is trained by his family to become a professional guitarist. Susumu soon forms an attachment with Socks as well.

A few months later, Akari's mother dies, and Akari grieves over her death for two days. After that, her neck becomes very stiff and she is unable to move it. With Socks' help, she realizes that this stiffness is actually due to her own imagination, and is thus "cured". She also finds out that Socks was actually placed in the garden by her mother. Not long after Akari's mother died, the family moves to Sapporo because her father was given a lecturer post at a university there. However, they cannot bring Socks along because their dormitory does not allow pets. Hence, Akari has to reluctantly entrust Socks to the care of Susumu.

Another problem surfaces when Susumu is accepted into a prestigious music school in Paris. On the day that he is leaving, Akari's father, who was supposed to be on leave that day, is suddenly called back to the hospital to do an "emergency" operation. This causes Akari to be late in seeing Susumu off. The "emergency" operation turns out to be a minor one, and he resigns after feeling guilty about disappointing his daughter. The family later moves back to their old home in Hakodate, and Socks comes back to stay with them. Akari's father later sets up a clinic in the home, which proves to be popular with the locals.

10 years later, Akari is a university student studying to become a vet. By chance, she happens to see a poster advertising Susumu's upcoming performance in the city. The pair have a tearful reunion, and they soon start dating. During this time, she starts to feel that Socks is a constrain to her. She starts to bemoan the sacrifices that she has to make because of Socks. After Akari graduates from university, she becomes a zookeeper at Asahiyama Zoo. Akari seldom returns to her home, and neglects Socks in the process. However, she is reminded of the good friend Socks was when the dog helps Susumu gain enough confidence to play the guitar again after his accident.

As time passes, Socks starts to age and becomes weaker. Akari is shocked at how much weaker Socks looks on one of her rare visits home, and promises to visit it often. However, due to her heavy workload, she is unable to fulfill that promise. One day, her father phones her urgently to tell her that Socks was dying. Managing to get away from her work, she rushes back just in time. As its energy saps away, Akari reads the Ten Commandments of Dog Ownership again to see if she had done what she had promised 10 years ago.

After Socks' death, Akari and her father find long-lost photographs of Socks, and a letter from her mother. The letter tells Akari that Socks was meant to replace herself, though she added that Socks will not live as long as Akari. Akari is also reminded of the fact that her father sacrificed his career for her. Not long after, Akari and Susumu get married together.

Cast
 Rena Tanaka as the adult Akari Saito, a veterinarian at the Asahiyama Zoo.
 Mayuko Fukuda as the young Akari Saito.
 Etsushi Toyokawa as Yuichi Saito, Akari's father
 Shota Sato as the young Susumu Hoshi, Akari's childhood friend
 Ryo Kase as the adult Susumu Hoshi, a distinguished guitarist who later opens his own music school. Susumu later married Akari.
 Chizuru Ikewaki as Yuko Inoue, Akari's best friend in university. She later become a sales clerk at a departmental store.
 Reiko Takashima as Fumiko Saito, Akari's mother. She died due to an incurable disease.
 Akira Fuse as Shinichi Hoshi, Susumu's father. He is a professional guitarist like his son.
  as Susumu's mother
 
 Takashi Sasano
 Pierre Taki as the zookeeper
 Mina Fujii as the passerby who takes a photo of Akari and her mother

Production
10 Promises to My Dog is based on a novel authored by Hare Kawaguchi. This novel was in turn inspired by a set of rules entitled "The Ten Commandments of Dog Ownership".

Reception
Kevin Ma, reviewer for Love HK Film.com, describes director Katsuhide Motoki's approach to the story "very low-key and matter-of-fact", and added that "it almost feels like he decided to tell the story in a way that any director-for-hire would". He also criticized some of the characters. In particular, he said that Rena Tanaka "barely registers as the central character" and that "Ryo Kase fares even worse [than Rena Tanaka], but mostly because of his poorly-written plot device of a character than his acting skills in general." However, he did praise the child actors, saying that Mayuko Fukuda gives "the best performance as the child Akari". He also praised the ending of the film, describing it as "emotionally powerful and yet brilliantly understated". Yahoo! Japan holds the film with a review of 3.30 points (stars) out of 738 reviews.

References

External links
 10 Promises to My Dog on TV Tokyo 
 
 

Shochiku films
Films set in the 21st century
Films about dogs
Films about pets